Ashok Kumar is a Pakistani politician who has been a member of Senate of Pakistan, since March 2015.

Education
He has the degree of Bachelor of Medicine and Bachelor of Surgery (M.B.B.S) which he received from Jinnah Sindh Medical University in 1989.

Political career
He was elected to the Senate of Pakistan as a candidate of National Party on a reserved seat for minorities in 2015 Pakistani Senate election.

References

Living people
Pakistani senators (14th Parliament)
Year of birth missing (living people)